Hoffman Plastic Compounds, Inc. v. National Labor Relations Board, 535 U.S. 137 (2002), is a United States labor law decision in which the Supreme Court of the United States denied an award of back pay to an illegal immigrant worker, Jose Castro, who had been laid off for participating in a union organizing campaign at Hoffman Plastics Compounds plant, along with several other employees. The case was originally filed against Hoffman by Dionisio Gonzalez, an organizer with the United Steelworkers.

The National Labor Relations Board (NLRB) found that the layoff of Castro had violated National Labor Relations Act (NLRA) section 8(a)(3) on the unlawful firing of union supporters. Castro had  entered the United States illegally and had also used another person's identity (a friend's birth certificate) to gain employment at Hoffman Plastics.

In a 5–4 decision, with the justices divided along ideological lines, the Supreme Court interpreted that the Immigration Reform and Control Act of 1986 (IRCA), which penalizes undocumented workers and provides for significant penalties to companies that knowingly employ illegal immigrants, disallows the use of the make-whole remedial scheme of the NLRA against an employer that benefits any person who knowingly broke  immigration law. Chief Justice William Rehnquist delivered the opinion of the Court, joined by Justices Sandra O'Connor, Antonin Scalia, Anthony Kennedy, and Clarence Thomas.

Justice Stephen Breyer wrote a dissent, joined by Justices John Paul Stevens, David Souter, and Ruth Bader Ginsburg. They expressed concern that employers would use the illegal immigration status of an employee to relieve themselves of responsibility under the NLRA.

Facts
Hoffman Plastics, a small business based in Paramount, California, manufactures polyvinyl resins and plastic pipework. In 1988, Hoffman Plastics hired Castro after he had presented to Hoffman what seemed to be an authentic US birth certificate as verification of his legal right to work in the United States.

Approximately seven months after Castro was hired, the United Rubber, Cork, Linoleum and Plastic Workers of America of the AFL–CIO started an organizing campaign at Hoffman Plastics. Castro, along with several other employees, showed their support for unionization by participating in the handing out of fliers and union authorization cards.

In retaliation, Hoffman laid off Castro and the other pro-union employees. Three years later, the NLRB found Hoffman Plastics to be in violation of section 8(a)(3) of the NLRA and awarded Castro back pay and reinstatement at Hoffman Plastics, but at an administrative law judge hearing to decide how much back pay should be awarded to the parties involved, Castro admitted that he had entered the country illegally and used a friend's birth certificate to obtain the documents needed to gain employment.

After two unsuccessful attempts by Hoffman to reverse the decision to pay Castro, the Court granted certiorari.

National Labor Relations Act
The National Labor Relations Act was first instituted by the Democratic New York Senator Robert F. Wagner (D) in 1935, who submitted a bill to Congress to eliminate unfair labor practices of businesses. The NLRA outlines the benefits and rights of employees. One of its most important sections is section 7, which gives employees rights to organize labor unions without the fear of retaliation from their employer: "Employees shall the right to self-organization, to form, join, or assist labor organizations, to bargain collectively through representatives of their own choosing, and to engage in other concerted activities for the purpose of collective bargaining or other mutual aid and protection." The National Labor Relations Board brought the case to the Supreme Court with its determination based on the Wagner Act was violated by Hoffman Plastics for firing Castro and others for contributing to the Union organizing at the plant.

Section 7 entitles workers to organize or join a union if they are so desired, and protection is provided also by the First Amendment of the Bill of Rights in the US Constitution. There have been numerous cases brought to the courts by violators such as Walmart for firing employees for threats of employees organizing labor forces to better job benefits such as pay, medical insurance, and paid time off. In 2002, the NLRB brought more than 40 cases to court regarding violations of section 7 of the National Labor Relations Act against Walmart.

Immigration Reform And Control Act
The Immigration Reform And Control Act (IRCA) was originally the Immigration and Nationality Act, which was adopted by the 99th Congress was signed into law in 1986 by President Ronald Reagan. The Act added many new provisions for the purpose of requirements and punishments of the US immigrant workforce and served for the illegal documentation of the worker Jose Castro when he used a friends birth certificate for identification. The law states under section 101, "Control of Unlawful Employment of Aliens," that workers must provide proper documents such as a passport, certificate of United States citizenship, unexpired foreign passport, naturalization card, certificate of birth in the United States, or one that establishes United States nationality at birth with a stamp from the Attorney General. All documents must be verified to be confirmed as legal.

Judgment
The Supreme Court ruled 5-4 that Jose Castro had illegally worked at Hoffman Plastics because of his illegal immigration status. Sure-Tan, Inc. v. NLRB, one of the major cases used in finding its decision, was a very similar case about the firing of illegal immigrants. The Court did not refer to the Immigration Control and Reform Act in its findings and applied only one federal law, the National Labor Relations Act of 1938, since the issue was whether or not to pay the back pay, not the illegal hiring decision of Hoffman.

The NLRB sought back pay, which could have been earned if Castro had not been terminated. Under the IRCA, Castro was not a documented worker, and since he was ineligible to work. Therefore, the Supreme Court decided that no back pay could be awarded.

In dissent, Justice Breyer wrote:

Significance
According to the US Department of Labor, the ruling "does not mean that undocumented workers do not have rights under the U.S. labor laws." The ruling found that workers must have authorization to be working in the US to be protected under all labor laws. Knowingly committing fraud by using false identification to gain employment is as much as a crime as it is to hire illegal undocumented workers.

The decision of the NLRB to award back pay to Castro was overturned by the Supreme Court, which found that Castro was not eligible for back pay since he was an undocumented worker and was working illegally in the United States. When the Court ruled on Sure-Tan, it would have rewarded Castro the back pay to which he was entitled because he was protected under the law. Since Sure-Tan, the IRCA introduced new laws to help curb undocumented workers, but the new laws do not protect undocumented workers by allowing them six months to become a citizen or obtain a work visa.

See also
US labor law
List of United States Supreme Court cases, volume 535

References

External links

United States Supreme Court cases
United States Supreme Court cases of the Rehnquist Court
2002 in United States case law
United States labor case law
United States immigration and naturalization case law
National Labor Relations Board litigation
Plastics industry
History of Los Angeles County, California
United Steelworkers litigation